Dany Rigoulot (born January 13, 1944) is a former French figure skater who competed in ladies singles. She is the 1958-59 and 1961 French champion.

Results

References

 skatabase

French female single skaters
Olympic figure skaters of France
Figure skaters at the 1960 Winter Olympics
Living people
1944 births